Geronimo's Cadillac is Modern Talking's first single released from the fourth album In the Middle of Nowhere. This single is also the first one not to reach the top of the German singles chart. "Geronimo's Cadillac" was released in Germany and in other European territories on 6 October 1986. The single peaked at No. 3 on the German single chart on 3 November 1986, almost a month after its release. The single spent five weeks within the top-10 and total of 13 weeks on the top-100 in Germany. While "Geronimo's Cadillac" also entered the top-5 in Austria, it managed to enter the top-10 in Switzerland, Sweden and Norway.

Track listing 
7" Single Hansa 108620	1986
 "Geronimo's Cadillac" (Dieter Bohlen) - 3:12
 "Geronimo's Cadillac" (Instrumental) (Dieter Bohlen) - 3:12

12" Maxi Hansa 608 620	1986
 "Geronimo's Cadillac" (Long Vocal Version) (Dieter Bohlen) - 5:02
 "Keep Love Alive" (Dieter Bohlen) - 3:25
 "Geronimo's Cadillac" (Instrumental Version) (Dieter Bohlen) - 3:12

Other versions
"Geronimo's Cadillac" (1998 version) – 3:10
Included on the album Back for Good
"Geronimo's Cadillac" (2017 version) – 3:22
Included on the album Back for Gold – The New Versions

Charts

Weekly charts

Year-end charts

References

External links 
 Official Modern Talking website

Modern Talking songs
1986 singles
Number-one singles in Spain
Songs about cars
Songs written by Dieter Bohlen
1986 songs